Kirkilas Cabinet was the 14th cabinet of Lithuania since 1990. It consisted of the Prime Minister and 13 government ministers.

History

Formation

Algirdas Brazauskas resigned as the Prime Minister of the 13th government on 1 June 2006. After this event, the Homeland Union, the Liberal Movement and the New Union (Social Liberals) tried to form ruling coalition (so called "Coalition of Breakthrough") of their one, but the Social Democratic Party of Lithuania and the Lithuanian Peasant Popular Union also tried to do so. Attempt made by latter two parties was successful and new coalition also included the Civic Democratic Party and the Liberal and Centre Union.

After the interim Prime Minister, Zigmantas Balčytis failed to gather sufficient level of support in the parliament (only 53 members of the parliament belonged to new four party coalition), the President Valdas Adamkus appointed Gediminas Kirkilas of the Social Democratic Party of Lithuania as the Prime Minister on 6 July 2006. Although, possibility of snap elections of Seimas in 2007 was raised by spring and summer of 2006, the 14th cabinet received its mandate and started work on 18 July 2006, after the Seimas gave assent to its program (main opposition party – the Homeland Union – abstained in the voting).

Minority and majority governments
The government served as minority government from July 2006 to January 2008. Agreement between the Social Democratic Party of Lithuania and the Homeland Union had fixed term of six months, which could have been extended for other six months etc. By the end of 2007 Homeland Union withdraw its support for minority government and search of possible support from other parties began. In January 2008, the government became majority one when the New Union (Social Liberals) joined ruling coalition after weeks of negotiations, although the New Union (Social Liberals) in April 2007 already agreed to support minority government.

The government continued to serve until the end of the term of the Ninth Seimas, returning its mandate on 17 November 2008, soon after the elections to the Seimas in October. The government continued to serve in an acting capacity until the Second Kubilius Cabinet started its work on 9 December 2008.

Cabinet
The following ministers served on Kirkilas Cabinet.

References 

Cabinet of Lithuania
2006 establishments in Lithuania
2008 disestablishments in Lithuania
Cabinets established in 2006
Cabinets disestablished in 2008

lt:Sąrašas:Lietuvos ministrų kabinetai (nuo 1990)#Keturioliktoji Vyriausybė